Denis Canuel (born 22 October 1962) is a Canadian archer. He competed in the men's individual and team events at the 1988 Summer Olympics in Seoul, reaching the qualification rounds.

References

External links
 

1962 births
Living people
Canadian male archers
Olympic archers of Canada
Archers at the 1988 Summer Olympics
Sportspeople from Quebec
Pan American Games medalists in archery
Pan American Games silver medalists for Canada
Pan American Games bronze medalists for Canada
Archers at the 1987 Pan American Games
Medalists at the 1987 Pan American Games
20th-century Canadian people